Charles Henry Ruffell (born 16 September 1888 – 9 November 1923) was a British track and field athlete who competed in the 1912 Summer Olympics.

In 1912 he was eliminated in the first round of the 1500 metres competition, as well as in the first rounds of the 5000 metres competition and 10000 metres competition.

In 1913 he won the National Steeplechase, and in 1914 he was the winner of the National Cross Country Championship, which was held at Chesham.

During World War I, he was a sapper with the Royal Engineers, serving in Palestine. He died at the age of 35 from acute pneumonia, following a bout of influenza.

References

External links
profile

1888 births
1923 deaths
British male middle-distance runners
British male long-distance runners
British male steeplechase runners
Olympic athletes of Great Britain
Athletes (track and field) at the 1912 Summer Olympics